The Gary McFarland Orchestra is an album by Gary McFarland's Orchestra with guest soloist jazz pianist Bill Evans recorded in 1963 for the Verve label.

Reception

The Allmusic review by Douglas Payne states "The album is like a soundtrack celebrating the excitement of a big urban wonderland. The compositions are first-rate, McFarland's occasional vibes playing is simple and perfect. Bill Evans buoys the event with his graceful, individual style".

Track listing
All compositions by Gary McFarland     
 "Reflections in the Park" - 3:44
 "Night Images" - 5:54
 "Tree Patterns" - 4:58     
 "Peach Tree" - 5:05   
 "Misplaced Cowpoke" - 10:15   
 "A Moment Alone" - 6:10
Recorded at Webster Hall in New York City on January 24, 1963

Personnel
Gary McFarland - vibraphone, arranger, conductor
Bill Evans - piano
Phil Woods - clarinet
Spencer Sinatra - alto saxophone, flute
Julien Barber, Allan Goldberg - viola
Aaron Juvelier, Joseph Tekula - cello
Jim Hall - guitar
Richard Davis - bass
Ed Shaughnessy - drums
Technical
Val Valentin - director of engineering
Ray Hall - recording engineer
Charles Stewart - cover photography

References

 

1963 albums
Verve Records albums
Bill Evans albums
Gary McFarland albums
Albums arranged by Gary McFarland
Albums conducted by Gary McFarland
Albums produced by Creed Taylor